M194 may refer to:

M-194 (Michigan highway), a state highway in Michigan
Mercedes-Benz M194 engine, an automobile engine
Minardi M194, a Formula One race car